The list of Kosovo international footballers born outside Kosovo includes all the players who were born outside Kosovo, including the Kosovan diaspora. This has happened officially since 6 February 2013, when the national team was given permission by FIFA to play against FIFA member associations in international friendlies. The first non-Albanian international football player, Adis Nurković was born in Velika Kladuša, SFR Yugoslavia (now Bosnia and Herzegovina) and he represented Kosovo during the 2017. The majority of these players were born in Switzerland.

The following players:
have been called up or have played at least one full international match with national senior team.
were born outside Kosovo.
This list includes players who have dual citizenship with Kosovo and/or have become naturalized Kosovan citizens.
This list includes only players who have played with Kosovo from the first official international match against Haiti, and until their last match against Faroe Islands, on 19 November 2022.

The players are ordered per modern-day country of birth or if the country at the time of birth differs from the current, this is indicated with a subsection.

Players
Below is the list of the 64 players who have born outside Kosovo.
Players in bold are called up to the squad in last 12 months and are still active at international level.
Players with flags in front of their name are players who represented Kosovo, but now represent another national team.

Capped players

Uncapped players

Ineligible players

References

Player profiles

External links
 
Kosovo at National-Football-Teams.com
Kosovo at RSSSF

Association football player non-biographical articles
Kosovo
Footballers born outside
Kosovo
Born outside